Anderson, sometimes known as Winterborne Anderson, is a small village and civil parish in Dorset, England, situated in the North Dorset administrative district about  northwest of Poole. To the west are Winterborne Muston and Winterborne Kingston and to the east are Winterborne Tomson (which is also within Anderson parish) and Winterborne Zelston. In 2013 the estimated population of the parish was 60.

Anderson Manor was built for the third John Tregonwell of Milton Abbas in 1622. It is constructed out of dark red brick with bands of vitrified headers.

The civil parish was formed in 1933, following the merger of Winterborne Anderson and Winterborne Tomsom.

References

External links

Villages in Dorset